Tabaq (also Romanized as Ţabaq; also known as Namdād, Notarkanī Nīmdād, Notarkanī-ye Nīmdād, and Ţabaq-e Namdād) is a village in Kuhestan Rural District, Jazmurian District, Rudbar-e Jonubi County, Kerman Province, Iran. At the 2006 census, its population was 297, in 62 families.

References

External links  

 ELAR archive of Tabaq language documentation materials

Populated places in Rudbar-e Jonubi County